William David Creighton (July 13, 1892 – February 2, 1970) was a professional ice hockey player from Kenora, Ontario.  He played left wing, and point (defence) for the Quebec Bulldogs. In 1912–13 he helped Quebec win the Stanley Cup, as a substitute player.  He played four games with the Montreal Canadiens in 1917 before joining the Toronto Blueshirts.  In the Canadiens records, he is referred to as Dave Creighton.

References

1892 births
1970 deaths
Canadian ice hockey left wingers
Ice hockey people from Ontario
Montreal Canadiens (NHA) players
People from Kenora
Quebec Bulldogs (NHA) players
Stanley Cup champions
Toronto Blueshirts players
Toronto Ontarios players